EMME is an acronym in the English language for an official grouping of 18 nations situated in and around the Eastern Mediterranean and Middle East.  As a geographical and regional identifier, EMME is often used in academic settings, military planning, disaster relief, media, and business writing. Moreover, the diverse region shares a number of cultural, economic, and environmental similarities.

Official Eastern Mediterranean & Middle Eastern (EMME) Nations 
EMME spans across three continents: Africa, Asia, and Europe. These countries include:

 Bahrain 
 Cyprus 
 Egypt 
 Greece 
 Iran 
 Iraq 
 Israel 
 Jordan 
 Kuwait 
 Lebanon 
 Oman 
 Palestine 
 Qatar 
 Saudi Arabia 
 Syria 
 Turkey 
 United Arab Emirates 
 Yemen

Unofficial EMME Cross Cultures, Variants, and Demographics. 
Some unofficial terms have a wider definition and use than EMME, including communities that identify as Arab, Middle Eastern, West Asian, North African, Levantine, Jewish, Hellenic, and other Eastern Mediterranean backgrounds. These include, and are not limited to:

 EMMENA (Eastern Mediterranean, Middle East, and North Africa)
 MEEMNA (Middle East, Eastern Mediterranean, and North Africa) 
 METNAH (Middle Eastern, Turkish, North African, and Hellenic)
 MENAA (Middle East, North Africa, and Aegean)
 MENA(+) (Middle East, North Africa, +)  According to the US White House's "Review of Standards for Maintaining, Collecting, and Presenting Federal Data on Race and Ethnicity," several of people debate with what should be included in the definition as MENA . The debate states that the League of Arab States, Turkish, Persians, Iranian, Jews, Israelis, Afghans, Azerbaijanis, Ethiopian, Portuguese, Georgians, Greeks, Italians, Somalis, Spaniards, Sudanese; Assyrians, Chaldeans, Coptics, and Armenians should be allowed to self-identify as MENA. Additionally, this reports states that the World Bank's classification of MENA should be used to define this diverse yet connected population

EMME Rapid Climate Change "Hot Spot" 
The academic journal EOS reports that EMME, "faces rapid climate change" and that "Observational and modeling studies identify the Eastern Mediterranean and Middle East as a prominent climate change hotspot associated with weather extremes that have major impacts on society."

According to the United Nations Economic Commission for Europe and the CORDIS EU Research of the European Commission, the Eastern Mediterranean and Middle East (EMME) Climate Change Initiative, launched by the president of Cyprus aims to bring these countries together to cooperate a concerted regional response to address the climate crisis, in line with the goals of the Paris Agreement.

This initiative states that "450 million inhabitants of the eighteen countries comprising the EMME region are at risk of a 5°C increase in mean annual temperature by the end of the century, under a “business as usual” scenario. This will lead to a catastrophe of unprecedented scale, inducing social collapse and mass migration, unless immediate action is taken on mitigation and adaptation through strong regional cooperation."

References